The Bulgarian Scenthound (balgarsko gonche) is a dog breed from Bulgaria. It originated in the Ludogorie region of northern Bulgaria, and is the most widely distributed smooth-haired hunting dog in Bulgaria. It is a non-standardised breed but conforms to hound body morphology.

The native breeds of the Balkans that are its closest relatives are the Greek Harehound, Serbian Hound, and the Transylvanian Hound.

See also
 Dogs portal
 List of dog breeds
 Bulgarian Shepherd Dog (native Bulgarian dog)
 Karakachan dog (native Bulgarian dog)

References

External links
 Development of exterior-zootechnic study for the Bulgarian scent hound - The Center for Preservation of Indigenous Breeds projects
 Exterior of Bulgarian scent hound – zootechnic study

Scent hounds
Dog breeds originating in Bulgaria